The Northern Ontario Railroad Museum and Heritage Centre is a rail transport museum located in the community of Capreol in Greater Sudbury, Ontario, Canada.  The museum's mandate states it is, "focused on the preservation of historical artifacts that pay tribute to the heritage of Northern Ontario and the history of the lumber, mining and railroading industries."

History

The Northern Ontario Railroad Museum & Heritage Centre was incorporated as a non-profit organization in 1993. During July and August, the museum initially operated out of the CN Caboose #77562 in Prescott Park with a small display of railroad memorabilia. In 1997, the museum acquired the former home of the superintendent of Canadian Northern Railway and Canadian National Railway, which they promptly converted into the NORMHC Museum House and main site, with Prescott Park acting as the outdoor portion of the attraction.

During the summer of 2010, NORMHC received funds from outgoing councilor Russ Thompson for the construction of a Garden of Life to promote organ and tissue donation. Significantly boosted by a major donation in 2013 by CN Rail, the project has since been completed but is constantly maintained and upgraded each museum season.

In 2012, the former Capreol fire hall was acquired by the museum. The fire hall was used actively until October 2010. Since it was built in 1923, it has served as the police station and jail, circuit court, temporary housing, council chambers, town offices, credit union, and the fire station.

Prescott Park
Prescott Park, named for the former mayor of Capreol Harold Prescott, holds the museum's outdoor locomotive and rolling stock exhibits, as well as the museum's G-Scale model train outdoor layout and children's play structure. This is also home to the Garden of Life, a garden exhibit dedicated to the awareness and celebration of organ donation in Ontario, in association with the Trillium Gift of Life Network.

Locomotive & Rolling Stock Collection
The museum's train collection includes four locomotives, six pieces of rolling stock, as well as several mining cars, handcars, and speeders. The museum currently has the following on display:

Locomotives:
Canadian National Railways #6077 1944 U-1-f Class MLW 4-8-2 steam locomotive
Temiskaming and Northern Ontario Railway #219 1907 MLW 4-6-0 steam locomotive
INCO #101 1919 Westinghouse Electric 50T locomotive
INCO #116 1948 General Electric 100T locomotive

Rolling Stock:
Canadian National Railways Caboose #77526 (built by Grand Trunk Railway in 1887)
Canadian National Railways Caboose #79231 (built by Hawker Siddeley in 1967)
Canadian National Railways Rules Instruction Car #15019 Stadacona (built by Pullman Standard in 1912 for Intercolonial Railway, currently used as a School Car exhibit)
Canadian National Railways Warehouse-baggage Car #60049 (built by National Steel Car in 1953)
Canadian National Railways Snow Plow #55208 (built by the Eastern Car Company in Trenton, Nova Scotia in 1924) is a single track wedge plow with wings
Canadian National Railways 30 Ton Crane #50392 (built by Browning/Wellman in 1957)
Vale Limited Hot Metal Car #5
Vale Limited Slag Pot Car

Heritage Centre
The Former Capreol fire hall, located one block east of the main site, is used to house and display the in-process restoration project of the town's first police vehicle purchase, a 1956 Dodge Fargo (used as the police force's paddy wagon and a 1929 Godferson Bickle fire engine. The Fire Hall is also the location of the museum's library and offices, exhibits on the social history of the town and surrounding area, as well as annual exhibits involving different themes.

Model Railroad Layout
Unveiled and officially open on May 20, 2017, the Heritage Centre also holds the Museum's newest attraction, a 1000 sq. ft. HO scale model railroad layout. Deemed the largest in Northern Ontario, the layout took 2 years to complete (construction began in December 2015) and has been hand-built, painted and decorated by NORMHC volunteers as well as the Sudbury Model Railroaders Club. It features recreations of Capreol town features as well as scenes of Northern Ontario, including a space detailing the museum's outdoor exhibits in miniature.

Railroad Simulator
Opened May 2, 2017, the heritage centre also now features a railroad simulator, created and installed by RSI Simulators. Included in the admission price, visitors can use the simulator and experience the basics of train operation, with the scenery used based on a Northern Quebec area and a planned future update changing this to the Capreol yard and scenery around the town. The simulator is set to "arcade mode" to enable visitors to operate it with ease, however, the ability to operate in full "engineer" mode is also possible (the same setting used to train CN employees in the nearby yard).

Gallery

See also
 List of museums in Canada

References

External links

Northern Ontario Railroad Museum

 Railway museums in Ontario
 Museums in Greater Sudbury
 Rail transport in Greater Sudbury